Sion Bennett (born 27 November 1993) is a Welsh rugby union player for the Cardiff Blues. He moved to Cardiff in January 2017 initially on loan, and then on a permanent basis from April 2017 having previously played at Northampton Saints in the Aviva Premiership.

He previously played for semi-pros Carmarthen Quins, making his debut for them in 2011. He then made his Scarlets debut in a friendly against London Welsh in 2013.

In the summer of 2015, Bennett moved to Northampton Saints. He originally signed a one-year contract, which was extended in March 2016.

He is also a previous Wales U20 international, making 8 appearances for them in 2013.

References

1993 births
Living people
Rugby union flankers